65535 is the integer after 65534 and before 65536.

It is the maximum value of an unsigned 16-bit integer.

In mathematics 

65535 is the product of the first four Fermat primes:  65535 = (2 + 1)(4 + 1)(16 + 1)(256 + 1). Because of this property, it is possible to construct with compass and straightedge a regular polygon with 65535 sides. See constructible polygon.

65535 is the sum of 20 through 215 (20 + 21 + 22 + ... + 215) and is therefore a repdigit in base 2 (1111111111111111), in base 4 (33333333), and in base 16 (FFFF).

65535 is the 15th 626-gonal number, the 5th 6555-gonal number, and the 3rd 21846-gonal number.

In computing 
Some computer programming environments may have predefined constant values representing 65535, with names like . 
In older computers with processors having a 16-bit address bus (such as the MOS Technology 6502 and the Zilog Z80), 65535 (FFFF16) is the highest addressable memory location, with 0 (000016) being the lowest. Such processors thus support at most 64 KiB of total byte-addressable memory.
In Internet protocols, 65535 is also the number of TCP and UDP ports available for use, since port 0 is reserved.
In some implementations of Tiny BASIC, entering a command that divides any number by zero will return 65535.
In an unpatched version of Microsoft Excel 2007, many mathematical computations evaluating to 65535 will display incorrectly. For example,  displays as 100000 rather than 65535. Microsoft reports this to be a display-only bug for only 6 floating point numbers near 65535 and 65536. These display issues do not occur in editions of Excel that have been updated to Office 2007 service pack 2.
In Microsoft Word 2011 for Mac, 65535 is the highest line number that will be displayed.
In HTML, 65535 is the decimal value of the web color Aqua (#00FFFF) .

See also
 4,294,967,295
 255 (number)
 16-bit computing

References

Integers